Brontypena is a genus of moths of the family Noctuidae.

Species
Brontypena exima (Pagenstecher, 1886)
Brontypena lutea (Bethune-Baker, 1908)
Brontypena pellocrossa Prout, 1932

References
Natural History Museum Lepidoptera genus database

Calpinae
Moth genera